The Lake Fork is a tributary of the Mohican River,  long, in north-central Ohio in the United States.

In Ashland County, a 1936 U.S. Army Corps of Engineers dam causes the river to form Mohicanville Lake.

See also
List of rivers of Ohio

References

Rivers of Ohio
Rivers of Ashland County, Ohio
Rivers of Holmes County, Ohio